The Seattle Girls Choir (SGC) was established in 1982 by Dr. Jerome L. Wright as a "junior conservatory" where young women from throughout the Puget Sound region could gather after school to develop their music education.

In 2009, Dr. Wright retired as Artistic Director of SGC.  He was succeeded by Jacob Winkler.

The Choir School is divided into six levels, from youngest to oldest:  Piccolini, Dolcine, Vivissimi, Allegra, Cantamus and Prime Voci. Students range from the Kindergarten through 12th grades.

The curriculum includes vocal technique, music theory, sight singing, solfege, ear training, and general musicianship.

Achievements

First-place awards
 International Youth & Music Festival – Vienna, Austria
 Llangollen International Musical Eisteddfod, Wales – First Prize, Youth Choir Division
 International Choral Kathaumixw, Canada – First Prizes in Youth Choirs & Chamber Choirs

Second-place awards
 International Choral Kathaumixw, Canada – Second place in Children's Choir Competition
 Llangollen International Musical Eisteddfod, Wales – Second Place, Children's Folk Song Choir

Special performances

 Salzburg Festival, performance, July 19, 2009
 World Festival of Women's Singing – Salt Lake City, Feb. 4–7, 2004
 Czech Sacred Music Festival, Prague – Featured Choir, 2003
 Seattle Girls' Choir Twentieth Anniversary Concert – Benaroya Symphony Hall, Seattle – June 2002
 World Festival of Women's Singing (Americafest) – Co-host Choir with Elektra – 2001 Concerts at Town Hall, St. James Cathedral and Benaroya Symphony Hall, Seattle
 ACDA National Convention, San Antonio, Texas – March 2001
 Mass at St. Peter's Basilica & Concert at St. Ignatius, Rome – 2000
 Part of the Millennium Jubilee Cathedral Tour.  Cathedrals concerts in Vienna, Salzburg, Munich, Venice, Ravenna, Siena, Florence and Rome (by invitation of the Pope.)
 Portland International Children's Choir Festival "Featured American Choir" – 1998
 ACDA National Convention, San Diego, California – March 1997
 Harvard University Festival of Women's Choirs – 1996
 AmericaFest 1994:  Concerts in Minneapolis, Des Moines, Chicago, Grand Rapids, Toronto, Quebec City, the Maritimes and New England. (One of four Founding Choirs with Tapiola Choir of Finland, Shchedryk Choir of Ukraine and Efroni Choir of Israel.)
 ACDA National Convention, San Antonio, Texas – March 1993
 International Singing Week (Europa Cantat) – Veszprem, Hungary—1992
 International Choral Sympaatti – Helsinki & Tampere Finland – 1990
 ISME International Conference – Finlandia Hall, Helsinki – 1990
 Goodwill Games Arts Festival – Host Choir for the Soviet-American Youth Choir Festival – 1990
 Chorus America National Convention
 MENC National Convention – Anaheim, California – 1986
 East Coast US Tour – 1984 Boston, New York (UN & St. John the Divine), Philadelphia (Mayor's Fourth of July Celebration at Independence Hall), Washington, DC, Baltimore and Orlando
 West Coast US Tour – 1982 Portland, Eugene and San Francisco (Grace Cathedral)

European concert tours
1985, 1987, 1990, 1992, 1998, 2000, 2003, 2006, 2009, 2012, 2016.   Countries visited:  Norway, Finland, Denmark, Estonia, Russia, Germany, Belgium, Switzerland, Austria, Czech Republic, Hungary, Romania, Croatia, Slovenia, Italy, France, England, Scotland, Wales, Slovakia, Latvia, Lithuania

External links
  Seattle Girls' Choir webpage

Choirs of children
Culture of Seattle
Girls' and women's choirs
Musical groups established in 1982
1982 establishments in Washington (state)